Yoruba is a small genus of western African ground spiders first described by B. V. B. Rodrigues and C. A. Rheims in 2020 and added to the subfamily Prodidominae.  it contains only two species: Y. ibadanus and Y. toubensis.

See also
 List of Gnaphosidae species

References

Gnaphosidae genera
Spiders of Africa